Pedobesia is a genus of green algae in the family Derbesiaceae. Species within this genus can be found in New Zealand.

References

Ulvophyceae genera
Bryopsidales